"E ritorno da te" (literally I comeback to you) is a song by Italian recording artist Laura Pausini, released in September 2001 as the lead single from her first compilation album, The Best of Laura Pausini: E ritorno da te. The Spanish-language version of the song, titled "Volveré junto a ti" (I'll go back next to you), received an ASCAP Latin Music Award for Pop/Ballad Song in 2003, while the Italian-language version received a nomination for International Song of the Year at the 2003 NRJ Music Awards.

The song was inspired by Pausini's relationship with her manager Alfredo Cerruti.

In 2013, Pausini recorded a new version of the song for her second compilation album, 20 - The Greatest Hits.

Track listing
CD single – "E ritorno da te" (2001)
 "E ritorno da te" – 4:01
 "E ritorno da te" (Instrumental version) – 4:01
 "Fíate de mí" – 3:49

CD single – "Volveré junto a ti" (2001)
 "Volveré junto a ti" – 4:01

Digital download – "E ritorno da te" (2004)
 "E ritorno da te" (Live) – 4:19

Music video
The music video for the song was shot in Los Angeles and directed by Gabriele Muccino.
It was first broadcast in Italy on 21 September 2001 by Canale 5, and it was officially released on 24 September 2001. The video also features Italian actor Silvio Muccino and American actor Tyler Mia.

Charts

Notes

Laura Pausini songs
2001 singles
Italian-language songs
Spanish-language songs
Songs written by Cheope
Songs written by Laura Pausini
2001 songs
Songs written by Daniel Vuletic
Compagnia Generale del Disco singles